The Final Days is a 1989 television movie adaptation of the 1976 book written by Bob Woodward and Carl Bernstein. The movie is directed by Richard Pearce and follows the events in the Nixon White House after the Washington Posts Watergate revelations.

Plot
J. Fred Buzhardt inadvertently reveals the existence of a taping system to the Watergate Committee minority counsel. After the committee's majority counsel discovers the information, Alexander Butterfield is interviewed and confirms the taping system's existence.

Four days after the Yom Kippur War, Vice President Spiro Agnew resigns. Nixon turns over the tapes after the resignations of Elliot Richardson and William Ruckelshaus.

Later at his Key Biscayne home, Nixon holds his "I'm not a crook" press conference. James D. St. Clair is hired as Nixon's defense lawyer.

Featured cast

Awards and nominations
1990 Casting Society of America (Artios)
Nominated – Best Casting for TV Movie of the Week: Susan Bluestein1990 Emmy Awards
Nominated – Outstanding Cinematography For A Miniseries Or Movie: Fred MurphyNominated – Outstanding Directing For A Miniseries, Movie Or A Dramatic Special: Richard PearceNominated – Outstanding Made For Television Movie: Stu Samuels, Richard L. O'Connor, Susan Weber-GoldNominated – Outstanding Writing For A Miniseries, Movie Or A Dramatic Special: Hugh Whitemore1990 Golden Globe Awards
Nominated – Golden Globe Award for Best Actor – Miniseries or Television Film: Lane Smith'''

See also
 All the President's Men'', 1976 film

External links

1989 crime drama films
1989 films
1989 television films
1980s political drama films
ABC Motion Pictures films
American political drama films
American drama television films
Cultural depictions of Leonid Brezhnev
Cultural depictions of Henry Kissinger
Films about Richard Nixon
Films based on non-fiction books
Films directed by Richard Pearce
Films scored by Cliff Eidelman
Watergate scandal in film
1980s American films
1980s English-language films
English-language drama films